Akebono Maru No. 28 was a Japanese fishing trawler that capsized on 5 January 1982.The Minerals Management Service of Alaska reported she sank  north of the Adak and notes it at the top of its list of "Alaska's Ten Worst Shipping Losses
In The Last 20 Years". In total, 32 people died.

References

External links
 Official report at Ministry of Land, Infrastructure and Transport

Fishing vessels of Japan
Maritime incidents in 1982
Shipwrecks in the Bering Sea
1974 ships